Raúl Rubio Romero (born 4 July 1999) is a Spanish footballer who plays as a forward for Deportivo Aragón.

Club career
Born in Zaragoza, Aragon, Rubio began his career with CD Giner Torrero before joining Real Zaragoza in 2017; the club immediately loaned him to EM El Olivar. On 20 July 2018, after finishing his formation, he signed for Segunda División B side SD Ejea.

Rubio made his senior debut on 22 September 2018, coming on as a late substitute in a 0–2 home loss against Villarreal CF B. The following July, after featuring rarely, he moved to CD Brea in Tercera División.

In July 2021, Rubio returned to Zaragoza, being initially assigned to the reserves in Tercera División RFEF. On 8 May of the following year, after helping in the B-team's promotion with 19 goals, he made his first team debut by replacing fellow youth graduate Iván Azón in a 0–3 home loss against AD Alcorcón in the Segunda División.

References

External links

1999 births
Living people
Footballers from Zaragoza
Spanish footballers
Association football forwards
Segunda División players
Segunda División B players
Tercera División players
Tercera Federación players
SD Ejea players
Real Zaragoza B players
Real Zaragoza players